Murray Ridge Ski Area, also known as Murray Ridge Ski Hill, is a small ski resort located near Fort St. James, British Columbia, Canada. The area has been in operation since the 1976-77 ski season and is managed by the Fort St. James Ski Club. The facilities include a 557 m² (6,000 sq. ft) day lodge. The area's T-Bar is reputed to be the longest in the world. Development of the area, which began with only two rope-tows, was assisted by Al Raine.

Base elevation is 700 m (2,299 ft) with a summit elevation of 1231 m (4,038 ft), yielding a vertical drop of 530 m (1,739 ft). There are 22 runs and an average annual snowfall of 300 cm (118 in). 20 km of cross-country trails are adjacent to the ski hill.

References
Murray Ridge Ski Area website
BritishColumbia.com Ft. St. James page
Murray Ridge page, skiresorts.org site
Northern BC Ski Areas and Winter Sports, worldweb.com website

Omineca Country
Ski areas and resorts in British Columbia